The Yantra is a river in northern Bulgaria, a right tributary of the Danube.

In its upper course, it is alternatively known as Etar (Етър), its older name. The river flows into the Danube close to Svishtov.

The river characteristically forms a number of gorges as it flows northward through the foothills of Stara Planina.

Major cities on the river are Gabrovo, Veliko Tarnovo, Gorna Oryahovitsa, Polski Trambesh, and Byala, close to which is the famous Belenski bridge.

Honour
Yantra Cove in Livingston Island in the South Shetland Islands, Antarctica is named after Yantra River.

References

Rivers of Bulgaria
Landforms of Ruse Province
Landforms of Gabrovo Province
Landforms of Veliko Tarnovo Province
Geography of Veliko Tarnovo
Gorna Oryahovitsa
Gabrovo